Boîte à vendre, is a French comedy film from 1951, directed by Claude André Lalande, written by Jean Broussolle, starring Jeannette Allouin and Louis de Funès.

Cast 
 Jeannette Allouin
 Irène Hilda : A singer
 Simone Alma : A singer
 Maurice Schutz
 René Berthier
 Raoul et son chien
 Paul Demange
 Louis de Funès : rôle (?)
 Bob Ingarao
 Colette Deréal
 Richard Marsan
 Francis Boyer
 Delcassant

References

External links 
 
 Boîte à vendre (1951) at the Films de France

1951 films
French comedy films
1950s French-language films
French black-and-white films
1951 comedy films
1950s French films